The Annie Award for Animated Effects in an Animated Television/Broadcast Production is an Annie Award given annually to the best animated effects in television or broadcast productions. It was first presented at the 46th Annie Awards.

Winners and nominees

2010s

2020s

References

External links 
 Annie Awards: Legacy

Annie Awards
Visual effects awards